Gob-Y-Deigan Railway Station (Manx: Stashoon Raad Yiarn Ghob-Y-Deigan) was a station on the Manx Northern Railway, later owned and operated by the Isle of Man Railway; it served a beach near Kirk Michael in the Isle of Man and was an intermediate stopping place on a line that ran between St. John's and Ramsey.

Description and history

The exposed coastal section of the Manx Northern Railway between Peel Road and Glen Mooar viaduct was served by a small halt in the very early days of the railway.  This section of line caused the railway company headaches over many years owing to subsidence which was regularly rectified by the dumping of used locomotive ash along the sides of the running line.  This area is also cited as the reason for the railway acquiring a turntable to turn only the coaches, to equalise the weathering of paintwork at this exposed point.  Today the trackbed is walkable and it has sunk even further.
The halt was only short-lived and built to serve excursions for picnickers. It had no road access but did offer a basic waiting shelter, which survived in use as a lineside hut until the closure of the railway.

Route

See also

 Isle of Man Railway stations
 Manx Northern Railway

References

Railway stations in the Isle of Man
Railway stations opened in 1887
Railway stations closed in 1887